Farges-en-Septaine is a commune in the Cher department in the Centre-Val de Loire region of France.

Geography
Much of the infrastructure of Avord Air Base is contained within the southern part of the commune.

Population

Sights
 The church of Notre-Dame, dating from the twelfth century.
 The seventeenth-century chateau of Bois-Bouzon.

See also
Communes of the Cher department

References

External links

Old postcards of the Septaine district

Communes of Cher (department)